Stephen Gilfus is an American businessman, entrepreneur, architect and engineer known as "The Father of Modern E-Learning". He is a founder of Blackboard Inc. and CourseInfo LLC, where he held executive positions from 1997 to 2007. In July 2007, Gilfus started a global education think tank in Washington, DC, focused on education innovation.

Cornell University 
While at Cornell, as an academic scholar, Gilfus focused on the development of new businesses through his studies as a part of a burgeoning new series of studies within Cornell's Entrepreneurship Personal Enterprise program. Early on, his mentor, Professor Deborah Streeter gave him guidance and support in launching a new student club, the Cornell Entrepreneur Organization (CEO), focused on bringing together students from business and engineering in support of new business ideas. This club evolved into an organization now known as CEN (the Cornell Entrepreneur Network). In this capacity, he was a TA for Professor Streeter's business planning class, in which he mentored students on the development of new business plans and ideas and approaches., Gilfus won an award from Cornell for Business Consulting on a project he did in Streeter's class. During this time he was also an active student participant in the creation of Cornell's Entrepreneurship@Cornell program.

CourseInfo 
In 1997, Gilfus met Daniel Cane, his student, while he was a teacher's administrator for Cornell's entrepreneurship studies assisting Professor Deborah Streeter with her business plan writing classes. That year Cane won an award for a business plan developed in the class called "EleFun" based on an educational website business model. Earlier that year, Gilfus had also won an award from Cornell for his work in his business planning and consulting class. Cane approached Gilfus based on his successes at Cornell with the Cornell Entrepreneur Club and the two joined forces to found and develop CourseInfo into a platform for course-based websites or CourseSites as the called them.

CourseInfo LLC was a small e-learning company focused on the development of an innovative course management system. The CourseInfo platform was technologically advanced as it was one of only a few relational database-powered web-based applications launched in the late 1990s. CourseInfo released several product versions including the "Teachers Toolbox" and its foundational first release the Interactive Learning Network v.1. The original product developed at Cornell University was deployed on a Linux BSD system, written in PERL, with an Apache web server, and leveraged MySQL as its relational database, with the front end UI of the system being accessed through a web browser.

One of the first of its kind to use a relational database with a web front end or a "true" web-based application, these deployments are now known a LAMP web application software stack. The CourseInfo team had leveraged MySQL in 1996/1997 just a few short years after the release of the original MySQL database system on May 23, 1995. The Cornell team had unique access to the Cornell Theory Center, now the Cornell Center for Advanced Computing and leveraged supercomputing power, one of the key pillars of the internet and ARPANET/NSFNET at the time.

Blackboard 
In 1998, CourseInfo Llc., founded by Daniel Cane and Stephen Gilfus, and Blackboard LLC, founded by Michael Chasen and Matthew Pittinsky merged to form Blackboard Inc. The first e-learning product as Blackboard Inc. was branded "Blackboard's CourseInfo," but the CourseInfo brand was dropped in 2000.

Product strategy 
Blackboard was one of the first businesses to provide a free offering "Blackboard.com" for instructors to create free "CourseSites". All of Blackboard technology for .com and related services were hosted onsite at 1899 L St NW in secure server rooms run by the company. The building's owners had to install extra power to support the server rooms on the 11th floor, and add individual AC capability on the rooftop to support the server rooms.

Early on, the company needed to support a multi-platform, on-premise installation strategy as academic institutions were consuming both Unix based systems and Microsoft systems. Since the platform was built in PERL the company deployed mod_perl an extension to Apached that would also sit as a module to IIS on windows server machines, this allowed the team to create a multi-platform distribution model enhancing its relationships with ALL Unix based and Microsoft based server technologies. While working with the windows mod_perl the Blackboard engineering team found several bugs that then pushed back to Microsoft to fix in their deployment against IIS.

As the company expanded its market and business relationships, Gilfus and Pittinsky (both company co-founders) wrote one of the world's first enterprise platform "App Strategies"  Blackboard Product Strategy & Vision White Paper on Building Blocks (B2) Initiative outlining the launch of a "Building Blocks Initiative", introducing new thought concepts to extend the Blackboard Platform through plug-ins and 3rd party integrations and allowing for greater extensibility of the technology as an open platform for allowing for technology extensions.

In 2001, Gilfus joined a Mobile Steering Committee established and led by the President and CEO of McGraw-Hill Ryerson to explore mobile learning. Blackboard ended up buying Kayvon Beykpour's company Terriblyclever out of Stanford to deploy Blackboard Mobile Technologies.

Consulting services 
From 2004 to mid-2008, Gilfus was head of Blackboard's Global Education Consulting Practice where he built the service's operations and led a team of professionals focused on providing strategic eLearning consulting, training, and implementation services.

Gilfus was one of the key strategists behind Fairfax County Public Schools launch of the Blackboard platform for Fairfax 24/7 Learning.

He also led a core team of individuals that designed and implemented several large publisher white-label enterprise systems based on Blackboard Including:
 Pearson's Course Compass, a private-label version of Blackboard for Pearson Education.
 Elsevier Evolve
 McGraw-Hill
 and several others

Gilfus also deployed a specialized services team, within his group, to work on Course Compass and directly with Pearson on their development and deployment of their largest technology efforts the MyMathLab project led by Marjorie Scardino,

Education framework 
Around 2004, still with Blackboard, Stephen began to assemble data from the experiences of thousands of Blackboard customers and authored the "Educational Technology Framework", a model used to contemplate organizational, technological, and social impact of educational technologies on academic institutions – sometimes referred to as “The Gilfus Model of Educational Technology Adoption”. The model was updated in 2010.

Published works 
 Gilfus, Stephen (2000-12-20). "Product Strategy and Development Roadmap"(PDF). Blackboard Inc. (Product strategy for the core Blackboard platform from V4 - V6 and beyond.)
 Gilfus, Stephen; Pittinsky, Matthew (2000-01-01). "Blackboard Product Strategy & Vision White Paper on Building Blocks (B2) Initiative" (PDF). Blackboard. (Pragmatic partner program for the extension of the Blackboard platform.)
 Roberts, Judy; Beke, Jensen, Mercer (2000-12-20). "Harvesting Fragments of Time". McGraw Hill Ryerson. (Team Researcher) (Led by McGraw-Hill to design a model around "mobile learning" device distribution for students.)
 Gilfus, Stephen et al. (2001-01-10) "Blackboard 5: Introducing the Blackboard 5 - Learning system". Blackboard Inc. (1st extension of the product strategy outlined in 2000. This is V.5)
 Gilfus, Stephen et al. (2002-03-23) "Blackboard 5 - Release 5.5 Overview". Blackboard Inc. (A Release 5.5 Update.)
 Gilfus, Stephen (2002-09-15) "Release of Bb SCORM Player". Blackboard Inc.. (SCORM 1.2 Player in collaboration with the National Defense University, ADL Co-Labs, and the DOD)
 Gilfus, Stephen (2004-12-20) "Educational Technology Framework".
 Ellis, Cathy (2004-04-23) "Benchmarking Blackboard– From Champions To Transformers". BbMatters. (An independent article on the Educational Technology Framework.)
 Gilfus, Stephen et al.(2009-04-10) "Social Learning" Buzz Masks Deeper Dimensions". (One issue with today's offerings for social software in education is that they are being presented as “social learning” solutions, but they are not being designed, packaged or integrated with the greater concepts of social learning theory in mind.)	
 Gilfus, Stephen et al. (2009-10-25) "Intelligence Emerges from Enterprise Education Platform". (One of the most acute information technology gaps at colleges today is the huge discontinuity between the LMS and the ERP.) 
 Gilfus, Stephen (2009-10-27) Education Think Tank, Predicts Top Five Education Innovation Trends 
 Gilfus, Stephen (2010-12-20) "Educational Technology Framework 2010". Blackboard Inc. - Stephen Gilfus (Updated Educational Technology Adoption for 2010, for educational technology adoption.)
 Gilfus, Stephen et al. (2010-12-10) "Promise of Community Changes Technology Paradigms". (The changing paradigm of Learning Management Systems and web 2.0 social networking technology.)

Investments 
Gilfus is an active angel investor. He has provided market and technology due diligence services to dozens of industry investors, including New Enterprise Associates for LBO's, strategic investments, and strategic acquisitions. Mr. Gilfus is an Advisor and Investor in several Angel Networks and market-specific funds including:
 Baltimore based New Markets Venture Partners since its inception.
 Cornell alumni investment group Red Bear Angels

Presentations
 Gilfus, Stephen Cornell eClips Presentation Matthew Pittinsky Provides Introduction to Dan Cane, Steve Gilfus and Lecture on Company, Blackboard
 Gilfus, Stephen Cornell Class Presentation describing the founding of Blackboard View the Cornell University Presentation transcript
 Stephen Gilfus, Blackboard Founder, Discusses Academic and Professional Background at Entrepreneurship at Cornell Celebration 2009

Industry references
 FORBES and Gilfus on Archipelago, Why Is Archipelago Outpacing All Other Education Stocks?
 Campus Technology,  5 Higher Ed Tech Trends for 2012 from the Gilfus Education and Karen Cator of the Department of Education.
 The Journal, 5 K-12 Ed Tech Trends for 2012

See also 
 History of virtual learning environments
 History of virtual learning environments 1990s

References 

American computer businesspeople
1970 births
Living people
People from Pittsford, New York
Pittsford Mendon High School alumni
Cornell University alumni